Cycle to Work scheme is a UK Government tax exemption initiative introduced in the Finance Act 1999 to promote healthier journeys to work and to reduce environmental pollution. It allows employers to loan cycles and cyclists' safety equipment to employees as a tax-free benefit. The exemption was one of a series of measures introduced under the Government's Green Transport Plan. A Cycle to Work scheme does not require the prior approval of HMRC.

On 6 August 2010 HMRC issued a statement to clarify the fair market value, which should be charged if the employees want to take ownership of the bike at the end of the repayment. Some of the providers have always recommended continued use at no further charge as the best option to avoid any additional cost and remain within the scheme guidelines.

On 28 July 2011, HMRC published guidance stating that VAT needs to be accounted for on Salary Sacrifice payments for Cycle to Work from 1 January 2012. Employers can claim back VAT under some circumstances, but may no longer pass the VAT savings on to the employee.

Who is eligible 
Employers of all sizes across the public, private and voluntary sectors can implement a tax exempt loan scheme for their employees. The employees wishing to participate should be paid through the PAYE system. The scheme is not available to the self-employed or employees on the National Minimum Wage and any salary sacrifice arrangement must not reduce an employee's cash earnings below the National Minimum Wage threshold.

What equipment is included under the tax exemption 
Eligible equipment includes cycles and cyclists' safety equipment. The tax exemption defines a "cycle" as 'a bicycle, a tricycle, or a cycle having four or more wheels, not being in any case a motor vehicle'. An electrically assisted pedal cycle can be included under the scheme.

Cyclists' safety equipment is not defined in the legislation.

What value of equipment can be supplied 
There is no limit on the total value of the equipment including the cycle. It is possible to loan two cycles to one employee if, for example, that employee needed a cycle at either end of a train journey between their home and place of work.

However normally employers will wish to recover the cost of the equipment from the employee under a hire agreement. The employee can still makes the tax savings because the hire payments can be made from their gross salary via a salary sacrifice scheme.

Office of Fair Trading (OFT): Group consumer credit licence (expired)

Consumer Credit Licences ceased to exist with the closure of the Office of Fair Trading (OFT) on 31 March 2014. The Financial Conduct Authority (FCA) now regulates the consumer credit market, by granting authorisation to firms for consumer credit activities, in line with its regulatory regime.

Financial Conduct Authority (FCA)

Each of the activities regulated by the FCA are outlined in Chapter 2.7 of the Perimeter Guidance Manual (PERG), in the FCA Handbook Online. This includes both consumer credit and other regulated financial services activities.

In relation to Cycle to Work schemes there is a specific exemption which is detailed under PERG 2.11.3.

Under the OFT group licence, employers required separate authorisation for cycle orders over £1000.  The specific exemption for cycle to work schemes under the FCA also only covers orders up to £1000.  However, not-for-profit bodies are also specifically exempt from FCA regulation under PERG 2.3.2, regardless of the value of the cycle.  Other employers may also be exempt under the 'business test' which is defined in PERG 2.3.3.  FCA regulation is only required where employers are operating a scheme 'by way of business', a term which relies on various tests outlined in the perimeter guidance.

Unless employers apply for FCA regulation, cycle to work hire agreements should not include any reference to being regulated under the Consumer Credit Act.  The inclusion of such a statement may expose employers to consumer protection claims as the document may be considered to be misleading.

Where necessary, applications for authorisation are made via the FCA.

It is possible to run schemes in-house or purchase Salary Sacrifice and Hire agreements online. Some Cycle to Work schemes may use vouchers which limit where bikes can be bought, or are only on items at full RRP and exclude sale items, resulting in a total purchase cost greater than the market value.

Taxation
The exemption removes the tax charge that would otherwise apply to cycles and cyclists' safety equipment loaned to employees provided the following conditions are met:

 Ownership of the equipment is not transferred to the employee during the loan period
 Employees use the equipment mainly for qualifying journeys, i.e., for journeys made between home and workplace, or part of those journeys (for example, to the station), or for journeys between one workplace and another
 The Cycle to Work scheme is made available generally to employees of the employer concerned, and not confined to directors or offered to them on more favourable terms.

Implementation 
To take advantage of the tax and Class 1A NICs exemption, an employer can simply buy a cycle and cyclists' safety equipment, reclaim the VAT (if applicable), make use of the capital allowances and loan it to an employee for qualifying journeys to work. This arrangement means that the employee's normal salary arrangements are not affected. It may be, however, that the employer wants to recover the cost of providing the cycle and safety equipment loaned to the employee. Usually this would be done through a salary sacrifice arrangement. Some bike shops can provide these or they can be purchased online.

Cycle to Work Alliance 
Some of the biggest scheme providers have recently started Cycle to Work Alliance, a legal group to represent the interests of the scheme providers and users in negotiations with HMRC.

Other countries
Ireland has a similar scheme under which the cyclist owns the bicycle; a bicycle and (if wished) safety equipment can be bought up to a value of €1,500, with tax relief meaning that the bicycle is effectively half-price (depending on the level of tax paid).

References

External links
 Scheme Guidelines (ret. 13/12/2012)
 Department for Transport
 HMRC - Salary Sacrifice
 European Court set to back VATman in case which could cost employers £0.5bn in unpaid VAT - BDO
 The Scheme with no £1000 limit/faqs/
 www.gov.uk/expenses-and-benefits-bikes-for-employees
 Updated guidance on implementing the Cycle to Work Scheme

Cycling in the United Kingdom